The Karnataka State Film Awards 2014, presented by Government of Karnataka, to felicitate the best of Kannada Cinema released in the year 2014.

Lifetime achievement award

Jury 
A committee headed by K. Shivarudraiah was appointed to evaluate the awards. He said that the committee watched 73 films watched in 45 days before shortlisting 12 for a "re-watch in the second round".

Film Awards

Other Awards

References

2014